Toto is the surname of:

 Poutsos Toto (1498–1554), Italian painter and architect
 Gerald Toto (born 1967), French composer and performer
 Jonathan Toto (born 1990), French footballer of Cameroonian heritage
 Ismet Toto (1908–1937), Albanian bureaucrat, publicist, writer and political activist
 Linet Toto (born 1997), Kenyan politician
 Paolo Totò (born 1991), Italian cyclist

See also

Tono (name)